Huazhou Subdistrict is a subdistrict in Huazhou District, Weinan, Shaanxi, China.

History 
In June 2015, the Shaanxi provincial government upgraded Huazhou from a town to a subdistrict.

Administrative divisions 
Huazhou Subdistrict is divided into five residential communities and eight administrative villages.

Residential communities 
The subdistrict's five residential communities are as follows:

 Xiguan Community
 Dajie Community
 Wujia Community
 Dianli Community
 Hongling Community

Villages 
The subdistrict's eight administrative villages are as follows:

 Tiema Village
 Xiguan Village
 Chengnei Village
 Wujia Village
 Tuanjie Village
 Linwang Village
 Wangshizi Village
 Xiannong Village

References 

Township-level divisions of Shaanxi
Weinan

Subdistricts of the People's Republic of China